Oruza divisa is a species of moth of the family Erebidae first described by Francis Walker in 1862. It is found in Asia, including Hong Kong, Sri Lanka, Sulawesi, Taiwan, Japan and in Africa south of the Sahara, including Indian Ocean islands.

Description
The wingspan is 16–20 mm. The body is red brown or black brown. Its head is blackish or chestnut. Thorax and costal area of the forewings are pure white, or suffused with reddish ochreous. Sub-apical markings absent, the fascia being continued to the margin.

Gallery

References

Boletobiinae
Moths described in 1862
Lepidoptera of Cameroon
Moths of Madagascar
Lepidoptera of West Africa
Moths of Asia
Moths of Japan
Moths of Mauritius
Lepidoptera of Gabon
Moths of Réunion
Moths of Sub-Saharan Africa